Alar Rikberg (born 11 August 1981) is an Estonian volleyball coach, sport personnel and former indiaca player.

He was born in Tartu. In 2003 he graduated from the University of Tartu in public relations speciality.

He has won silver medal at World Indiaca Championships.

After 2010 he was the head of Tartu Tennis School. 2005–2018 he was the statistician of Estonia men's national volleyball team. Since 2020 he is the head coach of volleyball team Bigbank Tartu.

His brother is volleyball player Rait Rikberg.

References

Living people
1981 births
Estonian sportspeople
Estonian volleyball coaches
University of Tartu alumni
Sportspeople from Tallinn
Volleyball coaches of international teams
Estonian expatriate sportspeople in Poland
Estonian expatriate sportspeople in Russia